"My Old School" is a single drawn from Steely Dan's 1973 album Countdown to Ecstasy. It reached number 63 on the Billboard Hot 100.

The song's lyrics tell the story of a May 1969 drug bust at Bard College, referred to in the lyrics by its location, Annandale.  The incident happened while both Donald Fagen and Walter Becker were students there, and the song mentions how a female acquaintance had betrayed them to "Daddy Gee" (G. Gordon Liddy), then the local prosecutor. According to a 2014 Pittsburgh Post-Gazette article, 44 people were arrested, including Fagen, whose long hair was cut off at the Poughkeepsie jail. The upshot in the song is that the singer vows he is "never going back" to the college until "California tumbles into the sea".

Cash Box described the song as a "departure from the group’s usual fare, but definitely a track that’s going to have programmers and listeners buzzing."

Personnel
 Donald Fagen – piano, lead vocals, backup vocals
 Walter Becker – bass
 Denny Dias – rhythm guitar
 Jeff Baxter – lead guitar
 Jim Hodder – drums, percussion
 Sherlie Matthews, Myrna Matthews, Patricia Hall, Royce Jones – backup vocals
 Ernie Watts – saxophone
 Johnny Rotella – saxophone
 Lanny Morgan – saxophone
 Bill Perkins – saxophone

Key signature and composition
The song was written by Donald Fagen and Walter Becker and is in the key of G major. The original studio track features a guitar solo by Jeff Baxter.

Legacy
Fagen went back on his "never going back" promise. He returned to Bard College when he received an honorary Doctor of the Arts degree in 1985.

References

1973 songs
Steely Dan songs
ABC Records singles
1973 singles
Songs written by Walter Becker
Songs written by Donald Fagen
Song recordings produced by Gary Katz
Songs about school